Kaj Jørgensen (11 October 1925 – 11 March 2001) was a Danish footballer. He played in eleven matches for the Denmark national football team from 1950 to 1956.

References

External links
 

1925 births
2001 deaths
Danish men's footballers
Denmark international footballers
Place of birth missing
Association footballers not categorized by position